The Puye Cliff Dwellings are the ruins of an abandoned pueblo, located in Santa Clara Canyon on Santa Clara Pueblo land near Española, New Mexico. The site was declared a National Historic Landmark in 1966.

Ancient pueblo dwellings
Between 900 and 1580, up to 1500 Pueblo people lived in the area where they hunted game and cultivated food.  Native peoples first settled in the area in the late 10th century of the Pueblo II Era, living in dispersed farmstead dwellings at the east side of the Jemez Mountains.  Their settlements increased and changed over time in the Pueblo III Era, when they lived in larger, concentrated villages of Otowi, Puye, Shufinne, Tsankawi, Tsirege, and Tyuonyi.

The Puye Cliffs complex, the largest complex on the Pajarito Plateau, includes two levels of cliff-dwellings and surface and cave dwellings. The two levels of cliff dwellings, the mesa top and reconstructed 'Community House' are accessed by paths and about twelve stairways and ladders cut into the side of the cliff.

The dwellings were carved out of soft volcanic tuff (the Bandelier Tuff) on about a  cliff ridge. The rock is relatively soft and can be excavated using wooden tools.  The cliff dwellings held about 740 rooms and ruins at the base of the cliff that likely held additional dwellings.  On top of the mesa are cave dwellings of the Pueblo II Era around which a multi-storied puebloan village was built.  The south portion of the complex had 173 rooms on the ground floor.  The total number of rooms is not known, but would include rooms on the northern side of the complex and the upper levels.  In the center of the complex was a large plaza.

About 1580 (after the end of the Pueblo IV Era) drought finally forced the villagers to leave for locations nearer to the Rio Grande valley. The American Indians living in pueblos in northern New Mexico traditionally speak the Tewa language. The Tewa name 'Puye' can be translated as 'pueblo ruin where the rabbits assemble or meet'.

In 1907 Edgar Hewett, with the Southwest Society of the Archaeological Institute of America, excavated Puye Cliffs.  It was the first systematic excavation of a prehistoric pueblo in the Rio Grande valley.

Recent history

The cliff dwellings were declared a National Historic Landmark in 1966, under the name of "Puye Ruins."

In 2000, a planned burn of trees in Bandelier National Monument burned out of control.  The resulting wildfire, known as the Cerro Grande Fire, eventually claimed , some 250 houses in Los Alamos, and devastated Santa Clara Canyon.  Puye Cliff Dwellings site has been reopened to the public.  Current information can be obtained from Santa Clara Pueblo.

Tours can be scheduled to explore the cliffs and learn of their history.

In popular culture
The area features extensively in the 1952 film The Atomic City.

See also

 List of National Historic Landmarks in New Mexico
 National Register of Historic Places listings in Rio Arriba County, New Mexico
 National Register of Historic Places listings in Sandoval County, New Mexico
 Tsankawi
 Tsirege

References

External links

 Puye Cliff Dwellings
 Map and short guide showing how to find Puye
 Puye Ruins National Historic Landmarks Program
 Pictures of the cliff dwellings

12th-century architecture
Archaeological sites in New Mexico
Archaeological sites on the National Register of Historic Places in New Mexico
Buildings and structures in Rio Arriba County, New Mexico
Cliff dwellings
Dwellings of the Pueblo peoples
Former populated places in New Mexico
History of Rio Arriba County, New Mexico
Jemez Mountains
National Historic Landmarks in New Mexico
National Register of Historic Places in Rio Arriba County, New Mexico
Populated places on the National Register of Historic Places in New Mexico
Puebloan buildings and structures
Pueblos on the National Register of Historic Places in New Mexico
Ruins in the United States
Santa Clara Pueblo
Tewa